Thomas Patrick Hillman is a Welsh professional footballer who plays as a Winger or full-back.

Playing career
Hillman came through the Newport County youth team to make his first team debut on 7 November 2017, in a 2–1 defeat to Cheltenham Town in an EFL Trophy group stage match at Rodney Parade. He was released by Newport at the end of the 2018–19 season.

Career statistics

References

External links
 Newport County profile

Living people
Welsh footballers
Association football defenders
Newport County A.F.C. players
2000 births